This page provides the summaries of the OFC First Round matches for 1990 FIFA World Cup qualification.

Format
In this round four of the five teams were drawn into 2 home-and-away ties.

The 2 winners advanced to the second round of the OFC qualifiers.

Matches

|}

New Zealand won 8–1 on aggregate and advanced to the Second Round.

Australia won 5–2 on aggregate and advanced to the Second Round.

See also
1990 FIFA World Cup qualification (OFC)
1990 FIFA World Cup qualification (CONMEBOL–OFC play-off)

References

External links

1990 FIFA World Cup qualification (OFC)